South Division Two may refer to:

 South Division Two (shinty), a Scottish men's shinty division
 WCA South Division Two, a Scottish women's shinty division

See also
 South Division (disambiguation)
 South Division One (disambiguation)